Timothy James Gerard Pringle (born 29 August 2002) is a Dutch cricketer.

Biography
Pringle was born in 2002 in The Hague. His father is the former New Zealand cricketer Chris Pringle. He played his early cricket in New Zealand.

In June 2022, he was named in the Dutch One Day International (ODI) squad for their series against England. He made his ODI debut on 19 June 2022, against England. Prior to making his international debut for the Netherlands, Pringle played for the New Zealand national under-19 cricket team.

In July 2022, he was named in the Netherlands' Twenty20 International (T20I) squad for the 2022 ICC Men's T20 World Cup Global Qualifier B tournament in Zimbabwe. He made his T20I debut on 11 July 2022, for the Netherlands against Papua New Guinea.

References

External links
 

2002 births
Living people
Dutch cricketers
Dutch people of New Zealand descent
Netherlands One Day International cricketers
Netherlands Twenty20 International cricketers
Sportspeople from The Hague
New Zealand people of Dutch descent